Daniel Muñoz de la Nava was the defending champion but chose not to defend his title.

Maximilian Marterer won the title after defeating Uladzimir Ignatik 7–6(7–3), 6–3 in the final.

Seeds

Draw

Finals

Top half

Bottom half

References
 Main Draw
 Qualifying Draw

Morocco Tennis Tour - Meknes - Singles
2016 Singles
Tennis Tour – Meknes – Singles